Woodwalton Marsh is a  biological Site of Special Scientific Interest north-east of Woodwalton in Cambridgeshire. It is managed by the Wildlife Trust for Bedfordshire, Cambridgeshire and Northamptonshire.

This grassland on calcareous clay has diverse flora, including red fescue, quaking grass, knapweed, cowslip, pepper saxifrage, green-winged orchid and the rare sulphur clover. There is also a wide variety of butterflies.

There is access from New Road.

References

Sites of Special Scientific Interest in Cambridgeshire
Wildlife Trust for Bedfordshire, Cambridgeshire and Northamptonshire reserves